Kani Deraz (also Romanized as Kānī Derāz) is a village in Il Gavark Rural District, in the Central District of Bukan County, West Azerbaijan Province, Iran. At the 2006 census, its population was 181, in 17 families.

References 

Populated places in Bukan County